Ana Fortin (born 2 February 1972) is a Honduran swimmer. She competed at the 1988 Summer Olympics and the 1992 Summer Olympics.

References

1972 births
Living people
Honduran female swimmers
Olympic swimmers of Honduras
Swimmers at the 1988 Summer Olympics
Swimmers at the 1992 Summer Olympics
Place of birth missing (living people)